Space Opera is a science-fiction role-playing game created by Edward E. Simbalist, A. Mark Ratner, and Phil McGregor in 1980 for Fantasy Games Unlimited. While the system applies to the whole genre of science fiction, Space Opera has a default setting focused on creating space opera themed adventures.

Development
According to the Scott Bizar, the founder of FGU, "I wanted a SF rpg and I gave the job to Ed Simbalist. During the process I’ve never met Ed, nor Phil McGregor and Mark Ratner, who lived in the Canadian west, Australia and the east of the USA, respectively. The project was completed over more than two years entirely by correspondence." Ed was responsible for all the editing and coordination. Phil McGregor sent some technology and space ship related stuff which Ed liked so much that he incorporated it in the finished product. While the background universe was based on Mark Ratner's Space Marines, Ratner had little input into Space Opera itself. Part of the volume one introduction by Fantasy Games Unlimited owner Scott Bizar describes this undertaking:

Character creation
Character creation in Space Opera takes about an hour for an experienced and indepth character. The number of random rolls is limited, but the player has discretion in how points are applied and many choices among skills.

Players choose from the following classes: Armsman, Astronaut, Tech (with subclasses such as Armstech or Crimetech), and Scientist (Pure Researcher, Medical Researcher, Physician, & Engineering subclasses). The classes enable bonuses to be applied to personal characteristics and can ease the cost to acquire skills.

Space Opera characters' personal characteristics average out higher than the average person. Players roll a d100 for each of the 14 characteristics. These are Physique, Strength, Constitution, Agility, Dexterity, Empathy, Intelligence, Psionics, Intuition, Bravery, Leadership, General Technical Aptitude (GTA), Mechanical Aptitude, and Electronics Aptitude. Bonus points based on class can be applied to these rolls. Players compare the final number with a scaled table resulting in a number between 1 and 19 for each characteristic. Players make Characteristic Rolls (CRs) on a d20 during play.

Planet of Birth is made up of three rolls for Gravity, Atmosphere, and Climate. These can affect on Personal Characteristics choice of race.

Player characters can belong to any of the following races: Human, Humanoid, Transhuman, Pithecine, Canine, Feline, Ursoid, Avian, and Warm-blooded Saurian. Some of the races have characteristic prerequisites.

Other capabilities, such as Carrying Capacity, Damage Factor, and Stamina (based on Personal Characteristics) help to further define the character.

In the Career path the character goes through the recruitment process, participates for a random number of tours-of-duty, has opportunities for promotion, and finally musters out, in some cases with severance pay, pension benefits, savings, and personal gear. 

Finally, the player calculates the number of skill points available, chooses skills, and allocates points to those skills.

Races
Space Opera races are treated generally. Instead of assigning a unique name to a race, the game names them anthropomorphically. This allows any fictional raceto be simulated.

Player character races: 
Avian:  Anthropomorphic bird races.
Canine:  Anthropomorphic canine races. 
Feline:  Anthropomorphic felines come in two general strains: Mekpurr, the smaller and more technically adept and Avatar, larger, hunting cat varieties.  Example: Kzinti
Humans:  These include current Earth homo sapiens as well as all well-known biologically similar Science Fiction races.  Example: Fremen 
Humanoids:  Representative of human races who evolved away from the basic racial stock due to evolutionary adaptations to the local environment, and are generally not genetically compatible with Humans. Arrangement and even functions of internal organs differ. They may have adaptive extra organs, such as Desert planet humanoid's nictitating membranes and Olfactory organs more sensitive (similar to sharks and blood) to water. 
Pithecine: Anthropomorphic primate races resembling gorillas and the like, tending to be more emotional and more easily excited.  Example: Planet of the Apes
Saurian:  Anthropomorphic warm-blooded dinosaur races. They are a "cold blooded" group only empathically speaking, by human standards, with loyalty to race over family.  Example: Gorn 
Transhumans:  Any kind of humanoid race which has achieved a greater level of evolution than Humans/Humanoids, more intellectually oriented, and with higher psionic aptitudes.  Example: Vulcan
Ursoids:  Anthropomorphic bear races.  Example: Wookiee
IRSOL: Technically not a separate race, but any of the above races having fragile, taller and thinner frames for having evolved on low gravity managed atmosphere orbital installations, such as space stations, dome cities on asteroids, or wandering "StarCities."

Non-player character races: 
Space Opera also includes a list of races for Non-player Characters and for encounters that consist of some meaningful contact: 
Amoeboids, 
Avian/Whistler, 
Canine/Rauwoof, 
Cold planet beings,  
Feline/Avatar,  
Feline/MekPurr,  
Human,  
Humanoid,  
Icthyoid/Klackon,  
Icthyoid/Mertun,  
Insectoid/Arachnoid,  
Insectoid/Bug,  
Insectoid/Scorpionoid,  
Insectoid/Zzz'Kkk,  
IRSOL,  
Pithecine,  
Saurian/Hiss,  
Silicates,  
Transhuman, and  
Ursoid/Blarad.

Planet of birth
Characters can be born on a planet with any Gravity Field ranging from zero G to 2.5 G. Characters can also be born on a planet with many atmosphere types, ranging from low or no atmosphere in dome cities, to very high pressure atmospheres, with or without some contaminants, or partially exotic constituents. Finally, characters can be born on a planet with many Climate types:
Type 1 Standard Terran Planet
Type 1 Steppe Planet
Type 1 Arid Planet
Type 1 Desert Planet
Type 1 Swamp Planet
Type 1 Jungle Planet
Type 1 Tundra Planet
Type 1 Ocean Planet
Type 2 Terran Planet without seasonality
Type 3 Terran Planet with extreme seasonality
Type 4 Terran Planet with normal axial tilt at outer edge of stellar ecosphere
Type 5 Terran Planet with minimal axial tilt at outer edge of stellar ecosphere
Type 6 Terran Planet with extreme axial tilt at outer edge of stellar ecosphere
Type 7 Terran Planet with normal axial tilt at inner edge of stellar ecosphere
Type 8 Terran Planet with minimal axial tilt at inner edge of stellar ecosphere
Type 9 Terran Planet with extreme axial tilt at inner edge of stellar ecosphere
Type 10 Terran Planet with eccentric orbit crossing beyond the outer ecosphere
Type 11 Terran Planet with eccentric orbit crossing beyond the inner ecosphere
Type 12 Terran Planet with eccentric orbit crossing beyond the inner ecosphere & the outer ecosphere
Type 13 Terran Planet up to 10% beyond inner ecosphere limit (13/7, 13/8, 13/9) 
Type 14 Terran Planet up to 30% outside stellar ecosphere (14/4, 14/5, 14/6)
Type 13 Airless/Low pressure, managed domed environment, with moon-like extremes of temperature 
Type 14 Airless/Low pressure, managed domed environment, cold exotic atmosphere 
Type 15 Airless/Low pressure, managed domed environment, close to primary with high radiation
Type 15 High pressure, managed domed environment, high surface temperatures 
Type 16 Far out from primary, noontime high temperatures -80 °C to -185 °C 
Type 17 Far out from primary, noontime high temperatures -185 °C to -225 °C
Type 18 Far out from primary, noontime high temperatures -225 °C to -273 °C
Type 19 Rogue planet, completely frozen
Type 20 Gas Giants with orbital positions indicated as 20/15, 20/16, 20/17, 20/18, 20/19

Where not noted normal (10° to 30°) axial tilts are assumed,  extreme minimums with the suffix -A, extreme maximums with the suffix -B, with the exception of Type 2 and Type 3 which are axial tilt categories.

Psionics
Some characters are able to use Psionics, an advanced science with multiple fields of studies, three levels of functioning (Psionically dead, Psionically open, Psionically Awakened), and multiple skills. Characters who are open and Psionically attacked or have contact with a raw PK Crystal can awaken and learn skills by trial and error. Characters with high Psionic scores might be "contacted" and trained. Psionic fields include: 
Telepathy - 29 skills 
Telekinesis - 25 skills 
Teleportation - 4 skill 
Clairvoyance - 15 skills
Telurgy & Self-awareness - 12 skills
The Force - 11 skills

Technology
Space Opera technology mirrors the technology in stories traditional to that genre. Missing are the influences of cyberpunk, mechs, and nanotechnology, which all came later than the publication of the game.

Multi-Computers (500 kg - 50 tons) are based on a monolithic, mainframe-style that are meant to look after a least as many processes as the human brain takes care of for the human body, but for starships or cities. Space Opera also includes Mini-Computers at higher tech levels that are comparable to today's smartphones. A variety of software for computers is available covering "much of the significant knowledge of the race." The higher level Multi-comps (Mk.X to Mk.XIV) are considered sentient with "cybernetic rights."

Many other innovative sci-fi technologies are included, for example: Artificial Gills, Still Suits, medical and anti-aging drugs, Electro-Binoculars (1000 Lightyears range), ECM for communication and sensorscans, belt-size personal force-screen generators, power assisted personal armour, grav/jump belts, robots of every type, laser/blaster guns, laserswords & lightswords, anti-robot positronic brain disruptors (APROBDIF), etc.

Combat system
Combat is generally a four-step process. One first determines if a character scores a hit with his chosen weapon. Things like range, size of the target, movement, and amount of cover come into play. If one scores a hit, then one rolls to determine hit location. After hit location, one then determines if the attack penetrated the armor. Finally, damage is determined.
The full range of possible weapons technologies is covered, from the lowest tech level "Atlatl," to the high tech "Anti-Robot Positronic Brain Disruptor (APROBDIF)" guns and screens.

Official universe

While the Space Opera rules can be adapted to any imagined universe, the official universe was based on the nations described in Mark Ratner's Space Marines, and further defined through a series of Star Sector Atlases.

Books

The Space Opera core game consisted of two volumes and four double-sided 8x11" data sheets, in a box. There were three different box covers  
probably corresponding to three printings, and the two core books were merged into one binding in the last printing, but the contents remained the same throughout.

Reprints
Some components of Space Opera are in print again after a long absence and are available via FGU's online store and the RPG download sites DriveThruRPG and RPGNow.

The rights to the game are jointly held by the authors and Fantasy Games Unlimited, whereas the rights to the title were probably held by FGU solely. The rights to the game were to revert to the authors if the company went out of business. Despite going into dormant periods operating as a company in name only, FGU is still in operation. Ed Simbalist sought to buy the rights from the publisher Scott Bizar, however Bizar's asking price was judged too high.

From a December 2000 interview with Ed Simbalist:
"I won't write another version of Space Opera. Scott Bizar owns that property, hasn't done anything much to promote it, hasn't paid royalties that offer any hope that an author will be compensated for his considerable effort, and won't release it back to the authors. I know of the many persona[l] reverses he's experienced, and I doubt that FGU would ever become a viable publishing company in the future. Any revision work on my part would be a waste of time. Similarly, the expense of legally recovering the right to publish Space Opera isn't worth it. Apart from a highly inflated value placed by FGU on the game (actually on the NAME), why would I wish to purchase several thousand copies of a recent reprint that just won't sell in the current market? It makes no sense." Reportedly the asking price was $100,000, though the authors felt it was only worth $10,000.

New publications
Three new Star Sector Atlases, #4 and #7, and #6 were published in 2014, 2016, and 2018.

Reception
Stefan Jones reviewed Space Opera in The Space Gamer No. 33. Jones commented that "Despite its flaws, I highly recommend Space Opera. This game has the best of the other major SFRPGs on the market and more."

Eric Goldberg reviewed Space Opera in Ares Magazine #5 and commented that "If only the attention to science fiction in Space Opera could be combined with the smoothness of the Traveller game, sf role-players would not need to look any further."

Andy Slack reviewed Space Opera for White Dwarf #25, giving it an overall rating of 8 out of 10, and stated that "this is an extremely complicated game which will take a very long time to set up properly. It is also unusual for such a detailed game to be 'heroic' rather than 'realistic'. Nonetheless, for someone prepared to spend the time required to do it justice, this could be a rewarding and entertaining game."

William A. Barton reviewed Space Opera, 2nd Ed. in The Space Gamer No. 49. Barton commented that "for those who liked Space Opera originally or for those who thought it had potential but were turned off by the typos, omissions, etc., the 2nd edition is definitely worth having."

Casus Belli magazine #8 (April 1982), pg.26

See also
Fantasy Games Unlimited
Lists of fictional species

References

External links
Official site
Fan site

 
Fantasy Games Unlimited games
Role-playing games introduced in 1980
Space opera role-playing games